Carina Gustavsson (born 24 March 1962) is a Swedish rower. She competed at the 1984 Summer Olympics and the 1988 Summer Olympics.

References

External links
 

1962 births
Living people
Swedish female rowers
Olympic rowers of Sweden
Rowers at the 1984 Summer Olympics
Rowers at the 1988 Summer Olympics
People from Ängelholm Municipality
Sportspeople from Skåne County
20th-century Swedish women